SAVED Radio is a non-commercial Contemporary Christian radio service in the Philippines owned by Becca Music Inc., a non-profit events production company founded by Rebecca Sy (key figure and chairwoman of Ultrasonic Broadcasting System) which produces various concerts dedicated to Christian music.

History

Blocktime Programming with Energy FM 
Saved Radio first aired on February 6, 2011 via UBSI's Energy FM as a Sunday evening program titled Saved on Energy FM (with its then-flagship DWKY 91.5 FM carrying the program between 9pm to 12mn). When the show transferred to DWET, it expanded into a four-hour radio show, then expanded to six hours a few months after. By 2014, Becca Music renamed the show as SAVED Radio on Energy FM, along with a refreshed lineup of programs for each hour including its known portion entitled "The Worship Hour".

In mid-2015, SAVED Radio expanded its airtime to 18 hours on Sundays and introducing new programs with radio jocks hired separately from the Energy FM roster. Gaining positive feedback from its listeners, SAVED Radio finally became full-time a few weeks later, when it occupied the remaining Sunday airtime of Energy FM's programming. However, it continues to operate as a blocktime show on Energy FM and not as a separate broadcaster. Also, despite its expansion in Manila, SAVED Radio remained to be a late-night Sunday show on Energy FM's provincial stations.

A New Direction 
On December 24, 2017, through Saved Radio's Facebook page, Becca Music announced that Saved Radio would temporarily leave the FM radio band after December 31. No other details were revealed except for its upcoming return by 2018, yet the outcome of the FM relaunch is still unknown. As a compromise, though, Becca Music sets up an exclusive daily online streaming service on the Saved Radio website to allow loyal listeners of the program to continue listening on contemporary Christian music. By New Year's Day 2018, Saved Radio converted into an online radio service; while the Energy FM reoccupied the network's Sunday lineup; the first after two years (though, it continues to inform listeners on Saved Radio's online streaming promos).

References

External links

Radio stations established in 2011
Internet radio stations in the Philippines
Christian radio stations in the Philippines
Evangelical radio stations